This is a full list of all Cuban medalists, for more information about Cuba at the Summer Olympics click here

List of medalists

Olympic medalists for Cuba
Cuba
Olympic